Corfu (also ) or Kerkyra is a city and a former municipality on the island of Corfu, Ionian Islands, Greece. Since the 2019 local government reform, it is part of the municipality Central Corfu and Diapontia Islands. It is the capital of the municipality and of the Corfu regional unit. The city also serves as a capital for the region of the Ionian Islands. The city (population in 2011: 39,674 residents and the whole island 111,975) is a major tourist attraction and Greek regional centre and has played an important role in Greek history since antiquity.

History

The ancient city of Corfu, known as Korkyra, took part in the Battle of Sybota which was a catalyst for the Peloponnesian War, and, according to Thucydides, the largest naval battle between Greek city states until that time. Thucydides  also reports that Korkyra was one of the three great naval powers of fifth century BC Greece, along with Athens and Corinth. Medieval castles punctuating strategic locations across the city are a legacy of struggles in the Middle Ages against invasions by pirates and the Ottomans. The city has become known since the Middle Ages as Kastropolis (Castle City) because of its two castles. 

From 1386 to 1797, Corfu was ruled by Venetian nobility; much of the city reflects this era when the island belonged to the Republic of Venice, with multi-storied buildings on narrow lanes. The Old Town of Corfu has clear Venetian influence. The city was subjected to four notable sieges in 1537, 1571, 1573 and 1716, in which the strength of the city defenses asserted itself time after time, mainly because of the effectiveness of the powerful Venetian fortifications. Will Durant claimed that Corfu owed to the Republic of Venice the fact that it was the only part of Greece never conquered by the Ottomans.

In 2007, the old town of the city was inscribed on the UNESCO World Heritage List. Besides the city of Corfu/Kérkyra, its largest other towns are Kanáli (population 4,086), Potamós (3,840), Kontokáli (1,660), Alepoú (3,149), and Gouviá (838).

Palaiopolis

In the city of Corfu, the ruins of the ancient city of Korkyra, also known as Palaiopolis, include ancient temples which were excavated at the location of the palace of Mon Repos, which was built on the ruins of the Palaiopolis. The temples are: Kardaki Temple, Temple of Artemis, and the Temple of Hera. Hera's temple is situated at the western limits of Mon Repos, close to Kardaki Temple and to the northwest. It is approximately 700 m. to the southeast of the Temple of Artemis in Corfu. Hera's Temple was built at the top of Analipsis Hill, and, because of its prominent location, it was highly visible to ships passing close to the waterfront of ancient Korkyra.

Architecture 

In several parts of the town may be found houses of the Venetian time, with some traces of past splendour. The Palace of St. Michael and St. George, built in 1815 by Sir Thomas Maitland (1759–1824; Lord High Commissioner of the Ionian Islands) is a large structure of white Maltese stone. Near Gastouri stands the Pompeian style Achilleion, the palace built for the Empress Elizabeth of Austria, and purchased in 1907 by the German emperor, William II.

Of the thirty-seven Greek churches the most important are the cathedral, dedicated to Our Lady of the Cave; St. Spiridon's, with the tomb of the patron saint of the island; and the suburban church of St Jason and St Sosipater, reputedly the oldest in the island.  The city is the seat of a Greek and a Roman Catholic archbishop; and it possesses a gymnasium, a theatre, an agricultural and industrial society, and a library and museum preserved in the buildings formerly devoted to the university, which was founded by Frederick North, 5th Earl of Guilford (1766–1827, himself the first chancellor in 1824) in 1823, but disestablished on the cessation of the British protectorate.

Based on the ICOMOS evaluation of the old town of Corfu, it was inscribed on the World Heritage List. The ICOMOS experts have noted that "about 70% of the pre-20th century buildings date from the British period" and that "whole blocks were destroyed" in the Old Town by the German World War II blitzes; these were "replaced by new constructions in the 1960s and 1970s". The urban fabric was classified as being predominantly of the Neoclassical period "without special architectural features for which it could be distinguished". However, they note that the layout and structure of the city, including its Venetian fortifications, make Corfu a quintessential example of a fortified maritime city.

Layout

The town of Corfu stands on the broad part of a peninsula, whose termination in the Venetian citadel is cut off from it by an artificial fosse formed in a natural gully, with a salt-water ditch at the bottom, that serves also as a kind of marina known as Contra-Fossa. The old city having grown up within fortifications, where every metre of ground was precious, is a labyrinth of narrow streets paved with cobblestones, sometimes tortuous but mostly pleasant, colourful, and sparkling clean.  These streets are called "kantounia" and the older ones sometimes follow the gentle irregularities of the ground while many of them are too narrow for vehicular traffic. There is promenade by the seashore towards the bay of Garitsa, and also an esplanade between the town and the citadel called  where upscale restaurants and European style bistros abound. The origin of the name Liston has several explanations: many former Venetian cities have a square of that name, coming from a Venetian word meaning evening promenade, but it can also refer to the closed-list aspect of an up-scale area reserved to the nobility registered in the Libro d'Oro.

The citadel was depicted on the reverse of the Greek 500 drachmas banknote of 1983-2001.

Culture 

The city of Corfu has a long tradition in the fine arts. The Philharmonic Society of Corfu is part of that tradition. The Museum of the Philharmonic Society of Corfu presents in detail the musical heritage of the island.

Sports
Corfu is the only place in Greece where cricket is popular. It was imported into the island during British rule. The Hellenic Cricket Federation is based in Corfu and it is the only Greek sport federation that is based outside Athens. The most Greek cricket clubs are based in Corfu and they star in the Greek Championship. Notable cricket clubs of Corfu are Kerkyraikos G.S. (KGS), founded in 1893, GSK Vyron, founded in 1925 and AO Phaeax founded in 1976.

In other sports, Corfu has two teams with presence in higher divisions. The football club AOK Kerkyra, founded in 1969 originally as "AO Kerkyra", that plays in A Ethniki and the water polo club NAO Kerkyra (NAOK) founded in 1935, with earlier presence in A1 Ethniki Polo.

Climate
Corfu city has a Mediterranean climate. The summers are hot, rainless but humid with temperatures reaching . The winters are mild and wet, temperatures around on or above .

Government

Mayor history
Up until 1866, Corfu had no mayors. This list starts from 1866 and on.

Nikolaos V. Manesis (1866–1870)
Christodoulos M. Kiriakis (1870–1879)
Georgios Theotokis (1879–1885)
Ioannis Padovas (1885-1887)
 (1887–1895)
 (1895–1899)
Dimitrios Kollas (1899–1911)
Ioannis Mavrogiannis (1914–1925)
Spyridon Kollas (1925–1951)
Stamatios Desyllas (1951–1955)
Maria Desylla-Kapodistria (1956–1959), first female mayor in Greece.
Panagiotis Zafiropoulos (1959–1964)
Spyros Rath (1964–1967)
Municipal councils (1967–74)
Konstantinos Alexopoulos (1974–1975)
Spyros Rath (1975–1978)
Ioannis Kourkoulos (1979–1990)
Chrisanthos Sarlis (1991–2002)
Alexandros Mastoras (2003–2006)
Sotirios Micallef (2007–2010)
Ioannis Trepeklis (2011–2014)
Kostas Nikolouzos (2014–19)
Merope Hydraiou (2019–)

International relations

Twin towns - sister cities
Corfu is twinned with:

 Kruševac, Serbia (1985)
 Paphos, Cyprus (1992)
 Famagusta, Cyprus (1994)
 Meissen, Germany (1996)
 Troisdorf, Germany (1996)
 Asha, Cyprus (1998)
 Brindisi, Italy (1998)
 Vathy, Greece (1998)
 Carovigno, Italy (2000)
 Koper, Slovenia (2000)
 Sarandë, Albania (2001)
 Tremetousia, Cyprus (2001)
 Ioannina, Greece (2002)
 Bethlehem, United States (2013)
 Bar, Montenegro (2017)
 Bari, Italy 
 Zemun (Belgrade), Serbia
 Mytilene, Greece

Consulates
The city hosts consulates from the following countries:

 Austria
 Belgium
 Denmark
 France
 Germany
 Hungary
 Italy
 Netherlands
 Norway
 Portugal
 Russia
 Sweden
 Switzerland
 Serbia
 Spain
 United Kingdom

Quarters

Paleopolis
Nèo Frourio
Paleò Frourio-Aghios Geòrgios
Faliraki
Aghios Vlasios-Old Port
New Port
Platytera
Sarocco-Kotsella
Menekratous
Analipsi
Aghia Trias
Neratzicha
Anemomylos-Aghios Iàsson
Figareto-Kardaki
Stratia
Kyra Chrysikoù

Aghios Spyridon
Spianada-Liston
Aghios Antonios
Aghios Iakovos
Mandraki
Aghios Ioannis
Garitsa
Kanoni
Kanàlia
Alepou
Potamos
Kontokali
Evropouloi
Gouvia
Kommeno
Temploni
Kampiello (old town)
Spilia
Mantouki

Main streets 

 Markora Street
 Nikiforou Theotoki Street
 Eugeniou Voulgari Street
 Agiou Spyridonos Street
 Stamati Voulgari
 Philhellinon
 Filarmonikis
 Dousmani
 Moustoxydi
 Agion Panton
 Solomou

 Dimokratias Avenue
 Georgiou Theotoki Avenue
 Mantzarou Street
 Alexandras Avenue
 Margariti
 Aspioti
 Desylla
 Arseniou
 Panagouli

Media
TV: Corfu TV, Start TV
Newspapers: Kerkyra Simera

People

Gallery

See also
Ionian University
Septinsular Republic

References

External links

Municipal website

 
Populated places in Corfu (regional unit)
Capitals of former nations
Greek prefectural capitals
Greek regional capitals
World Heritage Sites in Greece
Greek city-states
Capitals of Greek states